The Lane Halt or Chanters Lane was a minor railway station or halt/request stop in north Devon, close to Bideford, on the Bideford, Westward Ho! and Appledore Railway, serving the outskirts of the town. It lay 0 mile and 55 chains from Bideford Quay.

History 
The halt lay just beyond the "Yard" with its sidings, carriage shed and engine shed. The halt was only 13 chains away from the Causeway Crossing Halt.

Infrastructure
The halt had no freight facilities. A platform 20 ft x 30 ft long was planned, 6 inches high and fenced at the back with no shelter. It is not clear if this facility was constructed. The level crossing was protected by semaphore signals. The up home signal at the Causeway Crossing Halt carried a fish-tailed distant signal that worked in conjunction with Chanters Lane's crossing home signal.

Micro history
In January 1901, the first train, with one carriage, ran from Bideford to Northam carrying a few friends of the Directors.

References 

Notes

Sources

 Baxter, Julia & Jonathan (1980). The Bideford, Westward Ho! and Appledore railway 1901-1917. Pub. Chard. .
 Christie, Peter (1995). North Devon History. The Lazarus Press. .
 Garner, Rod (2008). The Bideford, Westward Ho! & Appledore Railway. Pub. Kestrel Railway Books. .
 Griffith, Roger (1969). The Bideford, Westward Ho! and Appledore Railway. School project and personal communications. Bideford Museum.
 Jenkins, Stanley C. (1993). The Bideford, Westward Ho! and Appledore Railway. Oxford : Oakwood Press. .
 Stuckey, Douglas (1962). The Bideford, Westward Ho! and Appledore Railway 1901-1917. Pub. West Country Publications.

Disused railway stations in Devon
Former Bideford, Westward Ho! and Appledore Railway stations
Railway stations in Great Britain opened in 1901
Railway stations in Great Britain closed in 1917
Torridge District